Karnataka State Film Award for Best Screenplay is a state film award of the Indian state of Karnataka  given during the annual Karnataka State Film Awards. The award honors Kannada language films.

Superlative Winners

Award winners

The first recipient of the award is  S. R. Puttanna Kanagal. For six times, multiple writers were awarded for their work in a single film; Shankar Nag and Mariam Jetpurwala for Minchina Ota (1979), Singeetam Srinivasa Rao and Chi. Udayashankar for Bhagyada Lakshmi Baramma (1985, first time) and Anand (1986, second time), S. V. Rajendra Singh Babu and Ramani for Kothigalu Saar Kothigalu (2001), Prakash and M. S. Abhishek for Rishi (2004), Shashank and Raghu Kovi for Krishna Leela (2015).

The following is a complete list of award winners and the name of the films for which they won.

See also
 Cinema of Karnataka
 List of Kannada-language films

References

Karnataka State Film Awards
Kannada-language films